Logna is a frazione of the comune of Cascia in the Province of Perugia, Umbria, central Italy. At the time of the Istat census of 2001 it had 65 inhabitants.

References 

Frazioni of the Province of Perugia